Maxim Iurcu is a Moldovan footballer who plays as a forward.

Honours
Sheriff Tiraspol
Divizia Națională (2): 2011–12, 2015–16, 
Moldovan Cup (1): 2014–15
Moldovan Super Cup (1): 2015, 2016

References

External links
 

1993 births
Living people
Moldovan footballers
Association football forwards
Moldovan Super Liga players
FC Dinamo-Auto Tiraspol players
FC Sheriff Tiraspol players
Speranța Nisporeni players
FC Sfîntul Gheorghe players
Uzbekistan Super League players
FC Qizilqum Zarafshon players
Liga II players
FC Gloria Buzău players
FC Brașov (2021) players
Moldovan expatriate footballers
Moldovan expatriate sportspeople in Uzbekistan
Expatriate footballers in Uzbekistan
Moldovan expatriate sportspeople in Romania
Expatriate footballers in Romania